Salem is a parliamentary (Lok Sabha) constituency in Tamil Nadu, India. Its Tamil Nadu Parliamentary Constituency number is 15 of 39.

History
Since 1952, the Salem parliament seat was held by the Indian National Congress eight times (1952, 1957, 1962, 1984, 1989, 1991 and 2004), by the ADMK four times (1977, 1991, 2009 and 2014), by DMK three times (1967, 1971 and 1980), and once each by an independent (1998) and the Tamil Maanila Congress (1996).

Assembly segments
Salem Lok Sabha constituency is composed of the following assembly segments:

Before 2009:

1.Salem I ( defunct)

2.Salem II (defunct)

3.Omalur 

4.Yercuad (ST) (Moved to kallakurichi in 2009) 

5.Veerapandi

6.Panamarathupatti (defunct)

Members of the Parliament

Election results

General Election 2019

General Election 2014

General Election 2009

General Election 2004

General Election 1999

General Election 1998

General Election 1996

General Election 1991

General Election 1989

General Election 1984

General Election 1980

General Election 1977

General Election 1971

General Election 1967

General Election 1962

General Election 1957

General Election 1952

See also
 Salem
 List of Constituencies of the Lok Sabha

References

External links
Salem lok sabha  constituency election 2019 date and schedule

Lok Sabha constituencies in Tamil Nadu
Salem district
Government of Salem, Tamil Nadu